Aston Martin V8 Vantage may refer to:
 Aston Martin V8 Vantage (1977)
 Aston Martin Virage (1993–2000)
 Aston Martin V8 Vantage (2005)
 Aston Martin V8 Vantage (2019)

See also
 Aston Martin Vantage
 Aston Martin V8